Old Turkish may refer to:

 Old Anatolian Turkish
 Old Turkic
 Ottoman Turkish

Language and nationality disambiguation pages